The TACAM R-2 (Tun Anticar pe Afet Mobil R-2 – "Anti-tank gun on R-2 mobile gun carriage") was a Romanian tank destroyer used during World War II. It was built by removing the turret of the R-2 light tank (Panzer 35(t)) and building a pedestal to mount a Soviet  ZiS-3 field gun in its place. A three-sided fighting compartment was built to protect the gun and its crew. Twenty were built in 1944, but only one is known to exist today. It participated in the Budapest Offensive and the Prague Offensive.

Development 
By December 1942 it was blatantly obvious that Romania's R-2 light tanks (Panzer 35(t)) were no longer capable of standing up to Soviet medium tanks, but something had to be done to extend their service. It was decided to convert them to tank destroyers on the model of the German Marder II and Romania's own TACAM T-60, still in development. The turret was removed from one R-2 to serve as the prototype over the summer of 1943 to test the concept. A captured Soviet  M-1936 F-22 field gun was removed from its carriage and a new mount was fabricated to fit the gun to the turretless R-2. A fighting compartment was built using armor salvaged from captured Soviet tanks. New Romanian and German gun sights were fitted to suit the new Romanian ammunition. Forty were planned to be converted by Leonida in Bucharest, but the process couldn't begin immediately because Germany hadn't yet delivered the tanks that were to replace the R-2 which allowed the F-22 gun to be exchanged for the more powerful ZiS-3 gun on the production models.

Proposals were made to rearm them to better counter the new heavily armored Soviet Iosif Stalin tanks. Proposals were made to up-gun the vehicle with either the Romanian-built  Reşiţa Model 1943 anti-tank gun or the German  gun, but nothing was done before Romania changed sides in August 1944.

Description
The TACAM R-2 had a  ZiS-3 gun mounted on an R-2 light tank (Panzer 35(t)) chassis from which the turret had been removed. The armor plate for the gun shield was salvaged from captured Soviet BT-7 and T-26 tanks. The gun could traverse 30°, elevate 15° and depress 5°. A total of thirty rounds were carried for the main gun, twenty-one HE and nine AP. The chassis was little changed from that of the R-2 and retained its hull-mounted  ZB-53 machine gun.

Operational history
Leonida began work in late February 1944, and the first batch of twenty conversions was complete by the end of June. Production was halted then because the gun was thought inadequate to face the new heavily armored IS-2 tanks being fielded by the Soviets. Ten vehicles were organized into the 63rd TACAM Company in July 1944 and assigned to the 1st Armored Training Division. The rest of 10 vehicles were assigned to a Cavalry division. After 23 August coup, a company of twelve was assigned to the Niculescu Detachment when it was rushed north at the beginning of September to defend the Transylvanian frontier against the Axis counterattack from Hungary. Four more were added when the Niculescu Detachment was absorbed into the ad hoc Armored Group on 29 September in preparation for attacks intended to clear Northern Transylvania. This was successful and the Armored Group was disbanded when the joint Soviet-Romanian forces pushed the last Axis units out of Romanian territory on 25 October 1944.

Twelve were assigned to the 2nd Armored Regiment when it was sent to the front Czechoslovakia in February 1945. The Soviets immediately seized most of the TACAM R-2s in exchange for a few captured German tanks, but two were reported as operational on 31 March and two were still on hand on 24 April. One of these was destroyed before 30 April and the other was damaged mopping up German units near Brno in May. None were reported with the remnants of the regiment when it returned to Bucharest on 14 May 1945.

One survives today in the Romanian National Military Museum in Bucharest.

Photo gallery
The gallery shows the TACAM R-2 at the Bucharest Military Museum. Red paintjob photos are from 2006, light teal ones from 2019.

Notes

References

External links

 TACAM R-2 on worldwar2.ro
 photo series on Romanian armor
 TACAM R-2 walkaround on DishModels.ru

Tank destroyers of Romania
World War II tank destroyers
Military history of Romania during World War II
World War II armoured fighting vehicles of Romania
Military vehicles introduced from 1940 to 1944